Yala (Malay: Jala) is the southernmost Province (changwat) of Thailand. Neighboring provinces are (from northwest clockwise) Songkhla, Pattani, and Narathiwat. Yala is one of two landlocked provinces in southern Thailand, the other being Phatthalung. Its southern part borders Kedah and Perak of Malaysia.

Geography
Yala province is in southern Thailand. The highest point of the Sankalakhiri Range (Northern Titiwangsa Mountains), the -high Ulu Titi Basah (ฮูลูติติปาซา), is on the Thai/Malaysian border between Yala province and Perak.

National parks
There are three national parks, along with two other national parks, make up region 6 (Pattani branch) of Thailand's protected areas.
 Budo–Su-ngai Padi National Park, 
 Bang Lang National Park, 
 Namtok Sai Khao National Park,

Toponymy
The name "Yala" is the Thai transliteration of the Malay word "Jala" (Jawi: جالا), meaning "net", which was in turn derived from Sanskrit (Devanagari: जाल). The province is also known as "Jala" in Patani Malay language.

History

Historically, Pattani province was the centre of the Sultanate of Patani, a semi-independent Malay kingdom that paid tribute to the Thai kingdoms of Sukhothai and Ayutthaya. After Ayutthaya fell under Burmese control in 1767, the Sultanate of Patani gained full independence, but under King Rama I (reigned from 1782 to 1809), the area was again placed under Siam's control in 1785 and made a mueang. In 1808, Mueang Pattani was split into seven smaller mueang including Yala and Reman.

The province was recognized as part of Siam by the Anglo-Siamese Treaty of 1909, negotiated with the British Empire, while Siam surrendered its claims to Kelantan, Kedah, Terengganu, and Perlis.

There is a separatist movement in Yala, which after being dormant for many years, emerged again in 2004 and has become increasingly violent. Eight bombs exploded in the province over two days, on 6–7 April 2014. The bombings resulted in one death and 28 injuries, as well as damage to a warehouse estimated at 100 million baht.

The British Foreign and Commonwealth Office (FCO) in 2014 advised its citizens to only undertake essential travel in the province, while the Australian Government's Department of Foreign Affairs and Trade recommends that travellers completely avoid the province.

Demographics

Together with Narathiwat, Pattani and Satun Yala is one of the four provinces of Thailand with a Muslim majority. About 72 percent of the people are Malay-speaking Muslims and mainly live in rural locations. The remainder are Thai and Thai Chinese Buddhists, who live in towns and cities.

Symbols

The provincial seal shows a miner with simple mining tools including hoes, crowbars, and baskets. Yala was originally a mining town with tin and tungsten ores.

The provincial tree is the red saraca (Saraca declinata), and the provincial flower is the bullet wood (Mimusops elengi).

Khela mahseer (Tor douronensis) is the provincial fish, since it is a rare fish that can only be found in the lower southern region. Currently, Yala Provincial Fisheries Office is able to breed.

Administrative divisions

Provincial government
Yala is divided into eight districts (amphoe), which are further divided into 56 subdistricts (tambon) and 341 villages (muban).

Local government
As of 26 November 2019 there are: one Yala Provincial Administration Organisation and 16 municipal (thesaban) areas in the province. Yala has city (thesaban nakhon) status and Sateng Nok and Betong have town (thesaban mueang) status. Further 13 subdistrict municipalities (thesaban tambon). The non-municipal areas are administered by 47 Subdistrict Administrative Organisations - SAO (ongkan borihan suan tambon).

Transportation

In January 2022, Thailand's transport ministry completed the 1.9 billion baht Betong Airport. It opened in March 2022. Designed to handle 300 arrivals per hour, it is projected to serve 300,000 per year, which will later increase to over one million passengers per year, generating three billion baht for the district. Nok Air, Bangkok Airways, and Malaysia's Firefly Airlines had plans to fly to Betong in 2019. As of December 2022, only Nok Air and Bangkok Airways fly to Betong, with a twice-weekly service to Bangkok's Don Mueang Airport. The next nearest Thai airport to Yala is Hat Yai International Airport in Songkhla province.

Yala is served by the State Railway of Thailand from the Yala Railway Station.

The province lies on Route 410 (Pattani–Betong Highway), which runs from Pattani through Yala and Betong before passing through the Thailand-Malaysia Border.

Health 
Yala's main hospital is Yala Hospital, a regional hospital operated by the Ministry of Public Health.

Human achievement index 2017

Since 2003, United Nations Development Programme (UNDP) in Thailand has tracked progress on human development at sub-national level using the Human achievement index (HAI), a composite index covering all the eight key areas of human development. National Economic and Social Development Board (NESDB) has taken over this task since 2017.

See also
2007 South Thailand bombings
2019 Yala attack

References

External links

Province page from the Tourist Authority of Thailand
 Website of the province

 
Provinces of Thailand
Southern Thailand